The DFS Weihe (English: Harrier) is a German single-seat, high-wing, 18 metre wingspan, high-performance glider that was designed by Hans Jacobs in 1937-38.

Design and development
Jacobs designed the Weihe to be the pre-eminent performance glider of its era and indeed it captured many championships and set many records, until its performance was surpassed at the end of the 1950s. Even today it is considered one of the "classic sailplane designs".

The Weihe is of wooden construction with fabric covering on the wing trailing edges and the control surfaces. The spar is built from Baltic Pine, with a birch leading edge D-box, fuselage and the fixed portions of the tail surfaces. The airfoil is a modified Gö 549-M.2 section. Early versions took off from a dolly and landed on a fixed skid, while later versions has a fixed wheel and skid undercarriage. Originally fitted with DFS-style airbrakes, some were later modified for Schempp-Hirth style brakes instead. The aircraft incorporates a unique rigging system which was widely copied in later gliders.

Initially the aircraft was produced by Deutsche Forschungsanstalt für Segelflug (DFS) (English: German Research Institute for Soaring Flight) and later by Jacobs-Schweyer. Post World War II it was produced by Focke-Wulf as well as in France, Spain, Sweden and Yugoslavia. Production of the Weihe totaled over 400 aircraft.

Operational history
The Weihe won the World Gliding Championships in 1948 and 1950.

Dick Johnson won the US National Soaring Championships in 1959, flying a Weihe.

Variants
DFS Weihe
Original production version.
Jacobs-Schweyer Weihe
Second production version, before World War Two. Had a larger canopy and longer nose.
Focke-Wulf Weihe 50
Post war production version, with a blown canopy and a fixed wheel.
VMA-200 Milan
Post war French production of the Weihe,  by Minie, Saint-Cyr .

Aircraft on display
Lasham Airfield Gliding Heritage Centre
Museo del Aire, Madrid, Spain
US Southwest Soaring Museum

Specifications (Weihe 50)

See also

Notes

References

External links

Image of a Weihe
Detailed article on Weihe development history

1930s German sailplanes
Weihe
Glider aircraft
High-wing aircraft
Aircraft first flown in 1938